Tverråga is a river in the municipality of Rana in Nordland county, Norway.  The river flows from lake Tverrvatnet north until it joins the river Ranelva.  The river absorbs seven other rivers during its course, the last one by Hamaren near the village of Gruben.

The Svenskvegen bridge connecting the European route E6 highway to the village of Gruben to the east marks a name change on the bridge. South of the bridge this river is the Tverråga, but the remaining section of the river to the north of the bridge is called the river Revelelva.

Media gallery

See also
List of rivers in Norway

References

Rana, Norway
Rivers of Nordland
Rivers of Norway